Eucalyptus × conjuncta is a species of flowering plant that is endemic to a small area of New South Wales. It is a tree with rough stringy bark, lance-shaped adult leaves, flower buds in groups of eleven or more, white flowers and cup-shaped or hemispherical fruit. It is considered to be a stabilised hybrid between E. eugenioides and E. sparsifolia.

Description
Eucalyptus × conjuncta is a tree with rough, stringy bark on the trunk to the smallest branches.

Taxonomy and naming
This eucalypt was first formally described in 1990 by Lawrie Johnson and Ken Hill from a specimen Hill collected from near the Murrurundi golf club. The description was published in the journal Telopea. The authors noted that this appears to be a stabilised hybrid between E. eugenioides and E. sparsifolia and the name accepted by the Australian Plant Census is Eucalyptus × conjuncta. The specific epithet (conjuncta) is a Latin word meaning "connected" or "united", in reference to the intermediate features of this species.

Distribution and habitat
Eucalyptus × conjuncta grows in woodland on poor soil usually on sloping sites and is only known from near Murrurundi.

References

conjuncta
Myrtales of Australia
Flora of New South Wales
Trees of Australia
Plants described in 1990
Taxa named by Lawrence Alexander Sidney Johnson
Taxa named by Ken Hill (botanist)